"So Many Ways" is a song by British singer Ellie Campbell. The song was released in August 1999 as the second single from her debut studio album, Ellie (2001). The song peaked at number 26 on the UK Singles Chart, and remains her highest charting single to date.

Track listing
UK single (0519362)
 "So Many Ways" - 3:17
 "So Many Ways"  (Instrumental) - 3:17
 "Just Another Rainy Day" - 3:58

Charts

References

1999 singles
Songs written by Pete Waterman
Jive Records singles
Dance-pop songs